A statue of Harry F. Byrd was installed in Richmond, Virginia's Capitol Square, until 2021.

References

Buildings and structures in Richmond, Virginia
Monuments and memorials in Virginia
Outdoor sculptures in Virginia
Sculptures of men in Virginia
Statues in Virginia
Statues removed in 2021